Julie Ellen "Tawny" Kitaen (August 5, 1961 – May 7, 2021) was an American actress, model, and media personality. She began her career as a television actress, appearing in the television films Malibu (1983) and California Girls (1985). She also starred in the comedies The Perils of Gwendoline in the Land of the Yik-Yak and Bachelor Party (both 1984), and the horror film Witchboard (1986).

Kitaen garnered widespread recognition for her appearances in a number of heavy metal music videos, including Ratt's "Back for More" (1984) and Whitesnake's "Still of the Night", "Is This Love" and "Here I Go Again" (all 1987).

In the 2000s, Kitaen transitioned into appearing on reality television series, including The Surreal Life (2006) and Celebrity Rehab with Dr. Drew (2008), the latter of which documented Kitaen's issues with substance abuse.

Early life
She was born Julie Kitaen in San Diego, California in 1961, the eldest of three children born to Linda Kitaen (née Taylor), a housewife and one-time beauty pageant participant, and Terry Kitaen, an employee of a neon sign company. Kitaen's mother was of Scottish and Irish descent, while her father was of Russian-Jewish heritage.

Kitaen was raised in the Jewish faith. She began using the nickname "Tawny" at the age of 12 on her own initiative. As a child, she struggled with dyslexia, which led to her to drop out of Mission Bay High School. At the age of 14, with backstage passes after a Peter Frampton concert at Balboa Stadium, she witnessed the VIP treatment afforded Frampton's girlfriend Penny and aspired to achieve it for herself.

Modeling
Kitaen modeled and appeared in television commercials for Jack LaLanne's European Health Spas in the early 1980s. In a January 2021 Instagram post a few months before her death, she claimed the experience inspired her to become an actress.

Kitaen appeared on the cover of Ratt's debut EP Ratt (1983) and the band's debut Atlantic studio album Out of the Cellar (1984). She was dating the band's guitarist Robbin Crosby at the time.

Acting career
Kitaen began her acting career in 1983 with a minor role in the television movie Malibu. In 1984, she starred as the title character of the erotic adventure movie The Perils of Gwendoline in the Land of the Yik-Yak, also called Gwendoline. Her other film appearances include Bachelor Party (1984) as the bride-to-be of Tom Hanks’ character, and starring roles in the minor box office hit Witchboard (1986), White Hot, and Dead Tides.

She appeared in several music videos in the 1980s for the band Whitesnake, including the hits "Here I Go Again", "Still of the Night",  "Is This Love", and "The Deeper the Love".  She also appeared in Ratt's "Back for More" music video.

From February to July 1989, she appeared as Lisa DiNapoli on the daytime serial Santa Barbara. She appeared on Seinfeld as Jerry’s girlfriend in the 1991 episode "The Nose Job." She appeared in 19 episodes of the TV series The New WKRP in Cincinnati from 1991 to 1993 as nighttime DJ Mona Loveland, who has a show called Mona Til Midnight. She also had recurring parts in Hercules: The Legendary Journeys and co-hosted America's Funniest People from 1992 to 1994.

Reality TV
Kitaen joined the cast of the sixth edition of the VH1 reality television show The Surreal Life, which began airing in March 2006. She also appeared in the second season of the VH1 reality TV show Celebrity Rehab with Dr. Drew, which began in October 2008.  She appeared in the Season 4 Episode 12 of Botched, requesting that her breast implants be removed.

Personal life and death
Kitaen dated Ratt guitarist Robbin Crosby during and after high school. They moved in together as teenagers when Crosby was in the band Phenomenon.

Kitaen had a year-long affair with O. J. Simpson while he was married to Nicole Brown Simpson. The affair was revealed at Simpson's 1997 civil trial for wrongful death.

She married Whitesnake singer David Coverdale in 1989; they divorced in 1991.

Kitaen was married to baseball player Chuck Finley from 1997 to 2002, with whom she had two daughters, Wynter and Raine. In 2002 she was charged with domestic violence for an incident involving Finley, and three days later, Finley filed for divorce. In a plea bargain, she agreed to enter a spousal battery counseling program and avoid contact with Finley.

In November 2006, prosecutors charged Kitaen with possessing 15 grams of cocaine in her San Juan Capistrano home in Orange County. The authorities said her two children were home at the time and that she had granted deputies permission for the search. In December 2006, Kitaen entered a six-month rehabilitation program in exchange for the dismissal of a felony drug-possession charge.

On September 26, 2009, Kitaen was arrested for driving under the influence (DUI) in Newport Beach, California. The following July, she pleaded no contest to misdemeanor DUI and was sentenced to two days in jail, ordered to attend a first-offender alcohol program and required to perform 64 hours of community service.

On July 22, 2019, Kitaen was again arrested for DUI in Newport Beach. She was formally charged with a misdemeanor related to the arrest on October 22 of that year. Kitaen pleaded not guilty and was scheduled for a pretrial hearing on May 18, 2021. However, she died before the hearing could take place. If convicted, Kitaen could have been incarcerated.

Death 
Kitaen died at her Newport Beach home on May 7, 2021, at the age of 59. She had been working with author and historian Colin Heaton on her memoirs for the past year. Kitaen's death was confirmed to The New York Times by her daughter Wynter Finley, who told the paper that the cause of death was not immediately known. Police reported that nothing at the scene indicated alcohol or drugs as a factor in the death. The Orange County coroner's office declared it a "residential death", without further details.

In October 2021, the Orange County coroner's office announced Kitaen's official cause of death was dilated cardiomyopathy, a common type of heart disease.  Other contributing factors to her death included mild coronary atherosclerosis and ingestion of mirtazapine, alprazolam, acetaminophen, pregabalin, and hydrocodone.

Filmography

Film

Television

Music videos

References

External links
 
 

1961 births
2021 deaths
20th-century American actresses
21st-century American actresses
Actresses from San Diego
American film actresses
American people of Irish descent
American people of Russian-Jewish descent
American people of Scottish descent
American television actresses
Television personalities from California
American women television personalities
American voice actresses
Female models from California
Jewish American actresses
Participants in American reality television series
People from San Juan Capistrano, California
Actors with dyslexia
20th-century American Jews
21st-century American Jews
Deaths from cardiomyopathy
Drug-related deaths in California